"Lost in Paradise" is a song by American rock band Evanescence from their third self-titled studio album, Evanescence (2011). An alternative version appears on the band's fourth studio album, Synthesis (2017). Although initially penned by frontwoman Amy Lee as a personal song and anticipated to become a B-side, it was later recorded for the album. Wind-up Records released the song as the third single from the album on May 25, 2012. It was produced by Nick Raskulinecz. A snippet of the song premiered online on July 15, 2011, prior to its album's release in October. Musically, "Lost in Paradise" is a rock ballad that begins with piano, strings, and Lee's vocals before the band kicks in during the climax. Lyrically, it is inspired by the struggles in Lee's life during Evanescence's hiatus. The song was compared to Björk's song "Jóga" (1997) and the band's own "My Immortal" (2003).

The song received generally positive reviews from music critics, who praised Lee's vocals and its piano accompaniment, with some highlighting it as one of the album's best tracks. Following the digital sales of Evanescence, the song charted at number 99 on the Billboard Hot 100 and number nine on the UK Rock Chart. It also charted at numbers 31, 89, and 174 on the Swiss Singles Chart, Canadian Hot 100, and UK Singles Chart respectively. The band also added the song to the set list of their third worldwide tour Evanescence Tour (2011–12). After their performances at the Carnival of Madness tour, live footage of their performances were used to make a music video for the song. The song's live performance was received positively as well; one critic noted the song's building heaviness as the band became more involved.

Background

"Lost in Paradise" was written by Evanescence frontwoman Amy Lee while production was handled by Nick Raskulinecz. The song was recorded at Blackbird Studio in Nashville, Tennessee in 2011. A snippet of the song premiered on July 15, 2011 on MTV News, three months prior to the release of its album, Evanescence. During an interview Lee said, "That's the one that made us cry ... like, literally, just in here, working on it, there have been tears." At first, Lee anticipated that the song would become a B-side at most, thinking of the song as too personal for an album track.

However, after showing "Lost in Paradise" to Raskulinecz, he requested the band record the song for Evanescence. Lee credits Raskulinecz for the idea of the full band joining in mid-way through the song. Lee went to Toronto's Liberty Studios on August 22, 2011, to preview five mastered songs from Evanescence to a selected crowd of thirty people, including "Lost in Paradise". During an interview with Fuse in May 2012, the band revealed that it would be released as the album's third overall single. Wind-Up Records released the digital single on May 25, 2012.

Composition
"Lost in Paradise" is a symphonic rock, piano and power ballad, inspired by Lee's love for Evanescence and personal reflection on her past struggles. She revealed that after deciding to take a break, she spent a lot of time with her husband and having a simpler life away from her band, but still feeling like she was not "whole". Instead, she felt lost and missed her work with the band and the writing process. Later, she decided to write the song as an apology to her fans for being gone for so long. Starting with piano and Lee's vocals, the song slowly builds, "layering on stirring strings, booming timpani and, at the climax, some thunderous guitar chords" as stated by James Montgomery of MTV News. He further stated that the song had similarities with the song "Jóga" (1997) by Icelandic recording artist Björk which Lee confirmed by saying, "That's a big inspirational song for me. That's a song through my life that I've listened to a whole bunch. And to me, Björk, what makes her style are the strings, the orchestral elements, and that passion that it creates. ... It makes your heart pour out. That totally inspired me, and that song inspired me."  NMEs Tom Goodwyn found similarities between "Lost in Paradise" and "My Immortal", a song from the band's first studio album Fallen (2003), "before it was re-recorded with that massive guitar breakdown."

Critical reception
The song received generally positive reviews from contemporary music critics. Montgomery wrote that the song "is unapologetically epic and uncompromisingly raw, a song that manages to seem both all-encompassing and intimate, often at the same time." In his review of Evanescence, Rick Florino of Artistdirect concluded "The record's centerpiece is the elegantly dark ballad, 'Lost in Paradise'. It's in 'Paradise' that Lee's genius floats to the forefront most prominently. She paints a poignant picture of yearning for redemption from heartache crooning, 'We've been falling for all this time and now I'm lost in paradise.'" In another review, he called the song "the record's standout ballad." Kerrang!s Steve Beebee called the song "majestic" Dane Prokofiev of PopMatters said that the song was one of the two along with "Erase This" which "really caught" his attention. Edna Gundersen of USA Today put the song on her list of songs to consider downloading.

Chad Grischow of IGN wrote: "Lee's skyward vocals suit the album's obsession with the emotional frustration and devastation of a break-up well, ripe with romantically longing tunes like gorgeous power ballad "Lost In Paradise", where her breathy vocals in the beginning awaken as she passionately apologizes for not sticking with the guy who believed in her." Digital Spys Lewis Corner said that the song "continues the trend as a black-eyed rock ballad of towering string sections and lyrics of despair and heartbreak." Billboard magazine's Christa Titus wrote that Lee's voice was "powerful and flexible as ever" in "the deep croons that introduce 'Lost in Paradise'." A more mixed review for the song was given by Marc Hirsh of The Boston Globe who wrote that the slow tempo of the song provided by piano and strings made it a drag where "the band itself gets very little breathing room."

Chart performance
Following the digital release of the album, "Lost in Paradise" peaked at number 39 on the Swiss Singles Chart on October 23, 2011. On the Billboard Hot 100 in the United States, the song debuted at number 99 for the week ending October 16, 2011. The same week it peaked on the Hot Digital Songs and Canadian Hot 100 at numbers 53 and 89 respectively. The song also debuted at number nine on the UK Rock Chart for the week ending October 22, 2011. After the song was released as a single, it debuted at number 71 on the Austrian Singles Chart for the week ending June 8, 2012.

Live performances
The band added "Lost in Paradise" to the set list of the Evanescence Tour. While reviewing a performance of the song, Rick Florino of Artistdirect said, "Speaking of vocal prowess, Lee reached the level of legends during 'Lost In Paradise'. Sitting at a piano center stage, she entranced with a shimmering melody and heartbreaking, hypnotic hook. Stripped of any pomp and circumstance, Lee's talents transfixed. As the song built, the band entered rounding out the timeless ballad with a distinct heaviness." Serene Dominic of The Arizona Republic wrote: "The biggest shrieks came when the piano movers made their first appearance and wheeled a baby grand onstage for 'Lost in Paradise.'" Joel Francis of The Kansas City Star described the performance of the song as "spellbinding". Along with "Bring Me to Life" (2003), the song was played in the band's concert with a live orchestra for the Nobel Peace Prize in Oslo, Norway on December 11, 2011.

Music video
During an interview with Fuse in May, 2012, the band confirmed that a music video for the song would be released. The music video was planned for release after the Carnival Of Madness tours which the band embarked on in the summer of 2012. By the end of the tour, Lee asked fans via Twitter to send live footage from the tour so that it can be part of the video. A lyric video was uploaded to the band's official YouTube account on May 11, 2012. The official music video for "Lost in Paradise", released on February 14, 2013, focuses on the band's live tour, featuring footage of the band performing the song filmed by fans in the crowd from around the world.

Track listing
Digital single (May 25, 2012)
"Lost in Paradise" – 4:43
"Lost in Paradise" (Live) – 5:01
"My Immortal" (Live) – 4:25

Promo – Digital single (June 4, 2012)
"Lost in Paradise" (Album version) – 4:44

Charts

Release history

References

External links 
 

2010s ballads
2011 songs
2012 singles
Evanescence songs
Rock ballads
Song recordings produced by Nick Raskulinecz
Songs written by Amy Lee
Symphonic rock songs
Wind-up Records singles